Anodontostoma chacunda or Chacunda gizzard shad is a small species of gizzard shad found in both fresh and marine waters. The fish is from the family Clupeidae.

Habitat
It is found in Indo-West Pacific area mainly from Persian Gulf to coasts of India and Andaman Sea. it has also been reported from the Gulf of Thailand, Indonesia, Vietnam, Philippines, south to northern Australia, the Caroline Islands and New Caledonia.

Description
Individuals reach up to a size of 22 cm, with an average size of 14 cm .

Ecology
Anodontostoma chacunda usually dwell in marine environment mainly in coastal area, at times they venture into rivers and estuaries.

Fisheries
Chacunda gizzard shad is captured commercially and sold fresh or frozen, dried or dried-salted.

References

External links
http://www.marinespecies.org/aphia.php?p=taxdetails&id=713044

Clupeidae
Fish of India
Fish described in 1965